Michael Edward Fletcher (born February 17, 1977) is a former professional Canadian football linebacker. On February 16, 2009, he became a free agent.

As of May 9, 2011, Fletcher is a defensive co-ordinator for Paramount High School's football team.

In 2007 Fletcher was named to the All-time Argonauts team as an OLB. The same year, a set of Michael Fletcher ball caps was released by New Era.

College career
Fletcher attended the University of Oregon and was a four-year starter at cornerback and strong safety. He finished his college football career with six interceptions and 225 tackles.

References

https://web.archive.org/web/20120919110403/http://argonauts.ca/page/all-time-argos-depth-chart-2007

External links
 

1977 births
Living people
African-American players of Canadian football
American football linebackers
Canadian football linebackers
BC Lions players
Oregon Ducks football players
Sportspeople from Compton, California
Toronto Argonauts players
21st-century African-American sportspeople
20th-century African-American sportspeople